Strong is a surname. Notable people with the name include:

People
Anna Louise Strong (1885–1970), American journalist and author on the Soviet Union and China
Augustus Hopkins Strong (1836–1921), American theologian
Barrett Strong (1941–2023), American singer and songwriter
Benjamin Strong, Jr. (1872–1928), Governor of the Federal Reserve Bank of New York
Brenda Strong (born 1960), American actress and yoga instructor 
Caleb Strong (1745–1819), American politician, Massachusetts statesman
Carson Strong (born 1999), American football player
Cecily Strong, (born 1984), American comedy actress, and member of Saturday Night Live cast
Charles Strong (disambiguation), several people
Charlie Strong (born 1960), American football coach
Cornelia Strong (1877–1955), American mathematician and astronomer
Danny Strong (born 1974), American actor
Donald S. Strong (1912–1995), American political scientist.
Eithne Strong (1925–1999), Irish bilingual poet and writer.
Elizabeth Strong (1855–1941), American painter
Frances Lee Strong or Grandma Lee (1934–2020), American comedian
Frank Strong (born 1859), American educator
Genesta M. Strong (1885–1972), New York politician
George Strong (disambiguation), several people
Gwyneth Strong (born 1959), British actress
Henry Strong (disambiguation), several people
Herbert Strong (1880–1944), English professional golfer and golf course architect
Herbert A. Strong (1841–1918), Australian scholar
Herbert Maxwell Strong (1908–2002), American physicist and inventor
Jaelen Strong, American football player
Jamal Strong (born 1978), American professional baseball player
James Strong (disambiguation), several people
Jeremy Strong (disambiguation), several people
John Strong (disambiguation), several people
Joseph Strong (baseball) (1902–1986), American baseball player
Joseph Dwight Strong (1852–1899), American painter 
Josiah Strong (1847–1916), American clergyman and author
Ken Strong (1906–1979), American professional football player
Kenneth Strong (translator) (1925–1990), British scholar and translator
Kevin Strong (born 1996), American football player
Leonard Strong (1896–1958), English writer, novelist, journalist, and poet
Leonard Strong (actor) (1908–1980) America character actor specialising in Asian roles
Mack Strong (born 1971), American football player
Mark Strong (born 1963), English actor
Maurice Strong (1929–2015), Canadian industrialist, Secretary-General of the UN Earth Summit
Nathan Leroy Strong (1859–1939), US congressman from Pennsylvania
Patience Strong (1907–1990), pen name of Winifred Emma May, British poet
Paul Strong (born 1964, English cricketer
Pierre Strong Jr. (born 1998), American football player
Rider Strong (born 1979), American actor
Rollin M. Strong (1830–1897), American politician in Wisconsin
Roy Strong (born 1935), English arts curator, writer, broadcaster and garden designer
Samuel Henry Strong (1825–1909), Canadian judge, Chief Justice of Canada
Shiloh Strong (born 1978), American actor
Simeon Strong (1736–1805), Massachusetts judge
Tara Strong (born 1973), Canadian voice actress
Theron R. Strong (1802–1873), American congressman from New York
Thomas Strong (disambiguation), several people
Tommy Strong (1890–1917), English footballer
William Strong (disambiguation), several people

Fictional characters
 Captain Strong, in the Superman comics series;
 Mr. Strong, in the Mr. Men book series;
 Tom Strong, the title character of the comic book series Tom Strong
 Salami Strong, a minor and recurring character in the children's television series Let's Go Luna!.

See also
 General Strong (disambiguation)
 Governor Strong (disambiguation)
 Justice Strong (disambiguation)

Surnames from nicknames